The women's 200 metres at the 2013 World Championships in Athletics was held at the Luzhniki Stadium on 15–16 August.

Before the race, without her nemesis of the last 8 years, Veronica Campbell-Brown, Allyson Felix came into this race as the favorite.  She had won three gold medals in a row, but that streak was interrupted by Campbell Brown.  Felix was back to start a new streak.  But she was not without challengers, Shelly-Ann Fraser-Pryce was just two-tenths behind her at the previous Olympics and like the previous two Olympics, Fraser-Pryce had already won the 100.  And Kimberlyn Duncan had actually beaten Felix at the American Championships, but after a long college season, she didn't make it to the final.

At the gun, Fraser-Pryce was out quick, making up the stagger on Blessing Okagbare to her outside halfway through the turn.  The pressure was on, Fraser-Pryce was pulling away and before the turn was over, Felix was rolling to the ground with a pulled hamstring.  Jeneba Tarmoh and Murielle Ahouré were the next best to the straight, Okagbare a step back.  As Tarmoh faded, Okagbare managed to pass Ahouré, but Ahouré came back.  As the two battled, they were gaining on Fraser-Pryce, but not enough to make a dent in her huge lead.  After giving up .026 to Okagbare in reaction time at the start, Ahouré beat her by .008 to take silver, with nobody else close to the medalists.

Two sprinters, Turkmenistan's Yelena Ryabova and Ukraine's Yelyzaveta Bryzhina, gave positive drug tests at the competition.

Records
Prior to the competition, the records were as follows:

Qualification standards

Schedule

Results

Heats
Qualification: First 3 in each heat (Q) and the next 3 fastest (q) advanced to the semifinals.

Wind: Heat 1: 0.0 m/s, Heat 2: +0.1 m/s, Heat 3: 0.0 m/s, Heat 4: 0.0 m/s, Heat 5: −0.1 m/s, Heat 6: +0.3 m/s, Heat 7: +0.4 m/s

Semifinals
Qualification: First 2 in each heat (Q) and the next 2 fastest (q) advanced to the final.

Wind: Heat 1: 0.0 m/s, Heat 2: 0.0 m/s, Heat 3: −0.2 m/s

Final
The final was started at 21:15.

References

External links
200 metres results at IAAF website

200 metres
200 metres at the World Athletics Championships
2013 in women's athletics